The Comprehensive Crime Control Act of 1984 was the first comprehensive revision of the U.S. criminal code since the early 1900s.  It was sponsored by Strom Thurmond (R-SC) in the Senate and by Hamilton Fish IV (R-NY) in the House, and was eventually incorporated into an appropriations bill that passed with a vote of 78–11 in the Senate and 252–60 in the House. It was then signed into law by President Ronald Reagan. Among its constituent parts and provisions were:

 Armed Career Criminal Act
 Sentencing Reform Act which created the United States Sentencing Commission, intended to standardize sentencing
 extension of the Secret Service's jurisdiction over credit card fraud and computer fraud
 increased federal penalties for cultivation, possession, or transfer of marijuana 
 a new section in the criminal code for hostage taking 
 abolished parole for federal prisoners convicted after November 1, 1987
 made several new offenses federal crimes, including arson, murder-for-hire, trademark violations, credit card fraud, and computer crime 
 Stipulations about using civil forfeiture to seize assets of organized crime, establishing "equitable sharing."

References

United States federal criminal legislation
1984 in law
98th United States Congress
Presidency of Ronald Reagan

Asset forfeiture